The Karachi–Lahore Motorway (KLM) is a  under construction six-lane, high-speed, limited-access motorway that will connect Karachi and Peshawar through Islamabad, Lahore, Multan and Sukkur.

It was devised in the early 1990s as a combination of the M1 Motorway, M2 motorway, M3/M4 Motorway, M5 Motorway,
M6 Motorway and M9 Motorway. It is now considered a major component of the China Pakistan Economic Corridor, and will cost approximately $6.6 billion, with the bulk of financing to be distributed by various Chinese state-owned banks.

KLM is divided into seven sections including the 
 
Karachi-Hyderabad (M-9) section 136 km (Re-carpeting of existing Super Highway)
Hyderabad-Sukkur (M-6) section 296 km
Sukkur-Multan (M-5) section 387 km
Multan-Abdul Hakeem (M-4) section 103
Abdul Hakeem-Lahore (M-3) section 230 km
Lahore-Islamabad (M2) section 376 km
Islamabad-Peshawar (M1) section 166 km

The 296-km stretch of M-6 from Hyderabad to Sukkur is the last missing link on the Karachi-Lahore motorway on which construction work has yet to be started.

Sections

Lahore Abdul Hakeem Motorway

Abdul Hakeem Multan Section

Multan Sukkur Section

Sukkur Hyderabad Section

References

Proposed roads in Pakistan
China–Pakistan Economic Corridor